StarTech.com is a technology manufacturer, specializing in hard-to-find connectivity parts that are primarily used in the information technology and professional A/V industries. StarTech.com services a worldwide market with operations throughout the United States, Canada, Europe, Latin America and Taiwan. The company headquarters is located in London, Ontario with distribution centers in the United States, Canada, the United Kingdom, and Hong Kong.

History

Founding and beginnings
StarTech.com was founded in 1985 in London, Ontario, Canada by Paul Seed and Ken Kalopsis. The company’s first products to enter the IT market were anti-glare screens for CRT computer monitors, and keyboard dust covers.

International expansion
Although StarTech.com has been active in the Canadian and United States IT markets since the company’s beginning, it was not until 2004 that StarTech.com decided to focus on becoming a more globalized company, with the opening of a branch in Northampton, UK. In 2010, the company further expanded their UK operation, with the appointment of a Business Manager, UK Country Manager and National Account Manager. The same year, both the UK and USA warehouses were relocated to better accommodate demand for products. By 2012, StarTech.com was selling products in many European markets including France, Spain, Italy, Benelux as well as Mexico. In 2019, StarTech.com was selling in 23 countries worldwide, and has plans for further expansion.

Product range
The main emphasis of StarTech.com’s product range includes uncommon connectivity systems (adapters, converters, connectors, extenders, splitters and switches) which help users to overcome interconnectivity issues between legacy technology and devices that feature new technology and connector types. StarTech.com’s main category offerings are divided into 8 main product lines including:

 Audio/Video Products
 Electrical cables
 Server Management
 Hard Drive Accessories
 Expansion Cards
 Networking Products
 Computer Parts
 Laptop/Notebook Docking Station & USB Hubs

References

Companies based in London, Ontario
Computer peripheral companies